Shirley Sherrod (born 1948) is a former Georgia State Director of Rural Development for the United States Department of Agriculture. On  July 19, 2010, she became a subject of controversy when parts of a speech she gave were publicized by Breitbart News, and she was forced to resign. However, upon review of the complete unedited video in context, the NAACP, White House officials, and Tom Vilsack, the United States Secretary of Agriculture, apologized for the firing and Sherrod was offered a new position.

Sherrod later sued Andrew Breitbart and co-defendant Larry O'Connor for defamation, false light, and intentional infliction of emotional distress. In October 2015, the suit was settled out of court on confidential terms.

Early life
Sherrod (née Miller) was born in 1948 in Baker County, Georgia, to Grace and Hosie Miller. In 1965, when she was 17 years old, her father, a deacon at the local Baptist Church, was shot dead by a white farmer, reportedly over a dispute about livestock. No charges were returned against the shooter by an all-white grand jury. This was a turning point in her life and led her to feel that she should stay in the South to bring about change. Several months after Miller's murder, a cross was burned at night in front of the Miller family's residence with Grace Miller and her four daughters, including Shirley, and infant son, born after her husband's killing, inside. 
 
That same year, Sherrod was among the first black students to enroll in the previously all-white high school in Baker County. Eleven years later, Grace Miller became the first black woman elected to a county office, one she continued to hold, .

Sherrod attended Fort Valley State College and later studied sociology at  Albany State University in Georgia while working for the Student Nonviolent Coordinating Committee during the Civil Rights Movement where she met her future husband, minister Charles Sherrod. She went on to Antioch University in Yellow Springs, Ohio where she earned her master's degree in community development. She returned to Georgia to work with the Department of Agriculture in Georgia "to help negro farmers keep their land."

New Communities land trust 
In 1969, Sherrod and her husband were among the U.S. civil rights and land collective activists co-founding New Communities, a collective farm in Southwest Georgia modeled on kibbutzim in Israel. According to scholarship by land trust activists Susan Witt and Robert Swann, New Communities' founding in 1969 by individuals such as the Sherrods connected to the Albany Movement served as a laboratory and model in a movement toward the development of Community Land Trusts throughout the U.S.: "The perseverance and foresight of that team in Georgia, motivated by the right of African-American farmers to farm land securely and affordably, initiated the CLT movement in this country."

Located in Lee County, Georgia, the  project was one of the largest tracts of black-owned land in the U.S. The project soon encountered difficulties in the opposition of area white farmers, who accused participants of being communists, and also from segregationist Democratic Governor Lester Maddox, who prevented development funds for the project from entering the state. A drought in the 1970s and inability to get government loans led to the project's ultimate demise in 1985.

Class action lawsuit 
After Sherrod and her husband lost their farm when they were unable to secure United States Department of Agriculture (USDA) loans, they became class action plaintiffs in the civil suit Pigford v. Glickman. The Department agreed to a settlement in which compensation was paid between January 1, 1981 and December 31, 1999, in what has been described as "the largest civil rights settlement in history, with nearly $1 billion being paid to more than 16,000 victims."

A federal law passed in 2008 — with then-Senator Barack Obama's sponsorship — to allow up to 70,000 more claimants to qualify, which included New Communities, for the communal farm in which Sherrod and her husband had partnered. In 2009, chief arbitrator Michael Lewis ruled that the USDA had discriminated against New Communities by denying a loan to the operation and extending more favorable terms to white farmers.  New Communities received a $12.8 million settlement that included $8.2 million in compensation for loss of farm land, $4.2 million for loss of income and $330,000 to Sherrod and her husband for "mental anguish".

Sherrod was hired by the USDA in August 2009 as the Georgia director of rural development, the first black person to hold that position.

Resignation from Department of Agriculture

On July 19, 2010, Shirley Sherrod was forced to resign from her USDA position after blogger Andrew Breitbart posted a selectively-edited video of Sherrod's address to a March 2010 NAACP event onto his website. Reacting to these video excerpts, the NAACP condemned her remarks and U.S. government officials called on her to resign. However, upon review of the complete, unedited video in full context, the NAACP, White House officials, and Tom Vilsack, the United States Secretary of Agriculture, apologized for the firing, and Sherrod was offered a new position with the USDA.

Lawsuit against Breitbart and O'Connor and settlement
In February 2011, Sherrod filed a lawsuit against Andrew Breitbart and co-defendant Larry O'Connor in the Superior Court of the District of Columbia; in her complaint, Sherrod accused Breitbart of defamation, false light and intentional infliction of emotional distress.  Following Breitbart's death in 2012, Breitbart's estate was substituted as a defendant.

The defendants removed the case to federal court. The case was assigned to U.S. District Judge Richard J. Leon, who repeatedly expressed frustration with the U.S. government's delays in providing discovery. In July 2014, a three-judge panel of the U.S. Court of Appeals for the D.C. Circuit overturned Judge Leon's order directing Secretary of Agriculture Vilsack to give a deposition as part of pretrial discovery. Sherrod was represented by the law firm of Kirkland & Ellis.

In October 2015, the parties reached a settlement on undisclosed terms, issuing a joint statement saying: "The parties regret the harm that Mrs. Sherrod suffered as a result of these events. In a gesture they hope will inspire others to engage in the difficult but critically important process of bridging racial divides, the parties have agreed to resolve this lawsuit on confidential terms."

Career timeline

References 

1948 births
African-American social scientists
Albany State University alumni
American Protestants
American sociologists
American women sociologists
Antioch College alumni
Georgia (U.S. state) Democrats
Fort Valley State University alumni
Living people
NAACP activists
People from Baker County, Georgia
United States Department of Agriculture officials
African-American farmers
21st-century African-American people
21st-century African-American women
20th-century African-American people
20th-century African-American women